Kathrin Weiss is a former Swiss slalom canoeist who competed from the mid-1970s to the early 1980s.

She won two medals in the K-1 team event at the ICF Canoe Slalom World Championships with a gold in 1977 and a bronze in 1979.

References
Overview of athlete's results at CanoeSlalom.net 

Swiss female canoeists
Living people
Year of birth missing (living people)
Medalists at the ICF Canoe Slalom World Championships